After Henry is a British sitcom written by Simon Brett.  It started on BBC Radio 4 and later moved to television. Prunella Scales and Joan Sanderson starred in both radio and television versions.

A novel, also by Simon Brett, followed the series.

Cast
Prunella Scales – Sarah France
Joan Sanderson – Eleanor Prescott
Gerry Cowper – Clare France
Benjamin Whitrow – Russell Bryant

Plot
Sarah France is the 42-year-old widow of a GP, Henry. She lives in an often volatile family situation with her mother, Eleanor Prescott, and her daughter, eighteen-year-old Clare France. After Henry's death, the three generations of women have to cope with one another as best they can, under their shared roof.

Sarah often finds herself in the middle of things, usually figuratively but always literally, as her mother lives upstairs and her daughter has the downstairs flat. Eleanor, ruthlessly cunning and emotionally manipulative, takes every opportunity to get one over on Sarah. Anything told to Eleanor will spread quickly throughout the extensive "geriatric mafia", the elderly of the area. Clare is trying to be independent of her mother, though often has to come running back in times of crisis.

The relationships among the three women change constantly through each episode. Sometimes mother and daughter ally against grandmother, sometimes mother and grandmother go against daughter, but usually grandmother and granddaughter gang up on the long-suffering Sarah, whose one haven is Bygone Books, the remarkably unsuccessful second-hand bookshop where she works for Russell, who dispenses in turn sympathy and wisdom. Most of the time, Russell sees the women's relationships second-hand through Sarah, although he isn't opposed to taking the occasional more active role when necessary. In turn, Sarah can see some of Russell's difficulties of living with a gay partner in 1980s London suburbia, while at the same time seeing Russell's relationship as the one perfect marriage she knows.

Episode list

Transfer to television

The BBC was reluctant to produce After Henry for television, so in 1988 after the third radio series Thames Television did so. Prunella Scales and Joan Sanderson returned as Sarah and Eleanor, but Gerry Cowper was, at the age of 30, considered too old to play Clare and was replaced by Janine Wood. Benjamin Whitrow was replaced in the role of Russell by Jonathan Newth. The show was popular, attracting over 14 million viewers. A second television series was shown during the same months as the fourth radio series with, in many cases, both radio and television episodes being broadcast on the same nights. The fourth television series was broadcast from July 1992, after the death of Joan Sanderson, who had died on 24 May.

References

1985 radio programme debuts
1989 radio programme endings
BBC Radio comedy programmes
Radio programs adapted into television shows
Works about widowhood